Frau Venus und ihr Teufel is an East German film. It was released in 1967.

Cast 
 Manfred Krug: Hans Müller / Tannhäuser
 Ursula Werner: Maria / Moritz
 Inge Keller: Venus
 Wolfgang Greese: Landgraf
 Helga Labudda: Josephine
 Peter Reusse: Walther
 Herbert Köfer: Heinrich
 Horst Papke: Roderich
 Rolf Hoppe: Siegfried
 Horst Kube: Wolfgang
 Hans Hardt-Hardtloff: Kuno
 Fritz Decho: Pfaffe
 Axel Triebel: Truchsess
 Carola Braunbock: Edeldame
 Willi Neuenhahn: Jäger Wilfried
 Erich Braun: Henker

External links
 

1967 films
1960s fantasy comedy films
German fantasy comedy films
East German films
1960s German-language films
Films about time travel
Films set in the 13th century
1967 comedy films
1960s German films